Carbon Nation is a 2010 documentary film by Peter Byck about technological- and community-based energy solutions to the growing worldwide carbon footprint.  The film is narrated by Bill Kurtis.  ASIN: B0055T46LA (Rental) and B0055T46G0 (Purchase).

Rather than highlighting the problems with use of fossil fuels, Carbon Nation presents a series of ways in which the 16 terawatts of energy the world consumes can be met while reducing or eliminating carbon-based sources.  It contains optimistic interviews with experts in various fields, business CEOs, and sustainable energy supporters to present a compelling case for change while having a neutral, matter-of-fact explanation.

Among those interviewed are Richard Branson, former CIA director R. James Woolsey, Earth Day founder Denis Hayes and environmental advocate Van Jones.

Much of the content of the film consists of interviews, some are listed above.  The list of interviewees also includes
 Lester R. Brown – president, Earth Policy Institute	
 Sean Casten – president and CEO, Recycled Energy Development
 Ralph Cavanagh – lead attorney, NRDC
 Bob Fox – partner, Cook+Fox Architects
 Thomas Friedman – author and The New York Times columnist
 Eban Goodstein – economic professor, Lewis and Clark College
 Gary Hirshberg – chairman, president, and CEO of Stonyfield Farm
 Sadhu Aufochs Johnston – chief environmental officer, City of Chicago
 Amory B. Lovins – chairman and chief scientist, Rocky Mountain Institute
 Joel Makower – executive director, GreenBiz.com
 Edward Mazria – executive director, Solar Richmond
 Arthur H. Rosenfeld – commissioner, California Energy Commission
 John Rowe (CEO) Exelon – chairman and CEO, Exelon Corporation
 Sherri W. Goodman

See also
An Inconvenient Truth
Renewable energy commercialization
Community wind energy

References

External links
 
 
 
 

2010 films
American documentary films
Documentary films about global warming
2010 documentary films
Documentary films about alternative energy
2010s English-language films
2010s American films